Sávio Bortolini Pimentel (born 9 January 1974), known simply as Sávio, is a Brazilian retired footballer who played as a left winger.

Known as "Anjo Loiro" ("Blonde Angel") and "Diabo Loiro" ("Blonde Devil"), he played most of his professional career in Spain, being a part of Real Madrid's setup during four-and-a-half seasons and appearing in more than 300 official games with four teams.

A Brazilian international in the mid/late 1990s, Sávio represented the nation in the 1996 Summer Olympics.

Club career

Flamengo / Real Madrid
Born in Vila Velha, Espírito Santo, Sávio started his footballing career at the Desportiva Capixaba youth team. Still as a junior he was transferred to Rio de Janeiro's Clube de Regatas do Flamengo, where he made his professional debut –– he was hailed as the new Zico by the fans and the press due to his footballing ability, but also due to his frail physique.

In 1995, as part of Flamengo's centennial celebrations, Sávio teamed up with the volatile Romário and Edmundo. After clashing with the former he was transferred to Real Madrid in 1998, helping the La Liga powerhouse to three UEFA Champions League titles and the 2001 national championship; in the 2002–03 season he served a loan stint in France, at FC Girondins de Bordeaux.

Zaragoza / Flamengo
In the following season, Sávio returned to Spain and was one of the most important players in Real Zaragoza, for which he played three years. In his first the Aragonese won the Copa del Rey, precisely against Real Madrid; in the second, he scored a career-best ten league goals.

In May 2006, Sávio returned to Brazil and Flamengo on a free transfer, signing a contract until December 2007. However, on 5 January of the following year, it was announced that he would be transferred to Real Sociedad also in Spain, for which he played his first league game on the 21st against Valencia CF; in late June, after the Basques' relegation, he joined fellow league team Levante UD, and played there until January of the following year, leaving as many teammates due to unpaid wages.

Later years
After a spell back in Brazil with his very first club, Desportiva Capixaba, Sávio signed in August 2008 with Cypriot side Anorthosis Famagusta FC, appearing with them in the 2008–09 Champions League. In January 2010 the 36-year-old returned to his country, joining Avaí Futebol Clube.

After a few months with the Santa Catarina club, Sávio retired at the end of 2010.

Career statistics

Club

1 Including 1 match in 1998 Intercontinental Cup, 1 match in 1998 UEFA Super Cup.
2 Including 4 matches and 1 goal in 2000 FIFA Club World Championship.
3 Including 1 match in 2000 Intercontinental Cup, 1 match in 2000 UEFA Super Cup.
4 Including 1 match in 2001 Supercopa de España.

International career
Never a part of any FIFA World Cup finals squad, Sávio did however play with Brazil at the 1995 Copa América, where the nation lost the final to Uruguay on penalties. He also won the bronze medal in the 1996 Summer Olympics in Atlanta, going on to collect a total of 21 full caps with four goals.

Honours

Club
Flamengo
Campeonato Brasileiro Série A: 1992
Campeonato Carioca: 1996
Copa de Oro: 1996
Copa do Brasil: 2006

Real Madrid
La Liga: 2000–01
Supercopa de España: 2001
UEFA Champions League: 1997–98, 1999–2000, 2001–02
Intercontinental Cup: 1998
UEFA Super Cup: 2002

Zaragoza
Copa del Rey: 2003–04; Runner-up 2005–06
Supercopa de España: 2004

Desportiva Capixaba
Copa Espírito Santo: 2008

Avaí
Campeonato Catarinense: 2010

International
Brazil
Summer Olympic Games: Bronze medal 1996

Individual
Copa de Oro: Top Scorer 1996

References

External links
 
 Brazilian FA Database 
 
 
 
 
 

1974 births
Living people
People from Vila Velha
Brazilian people of French descent
Brazilian people of Italian descent
Brazilian footballers
Association football wingers
Campeonato Brasileiro Série A players
Desportiva Ferroviária players
CR Flamengo footballers
Avaí FC players
La Liga players
Real Madrid CF players
Real Zaragoza players
Real Sociedad footballers
Levante UD footballers
Ligue 1 players
FC Girondins de Bordeaux players
Cypriot First Division players
Anorthosis Famagusta F.C. players
Brazil international footballers
Olympic footballers of Brazil
Footballers at the 1996 Summer Olympics
Olympic bronze medalists for Brazil
Olympic medalists in football
Brazilian expatriate footballers
Expatriate footballers in Spain
Expatriate footballers in France
Expatriate footballers in Cyprus
Brazilian expatriate sportspeople in Spain
Medalists at the 1996 Summer Olympics
UEFA Champions League winning players
1996 CONCACAF Gold Cup players
Sportspeople from Espírito Santo